Wonderland is a 2003 American crime drama film, co-written and directed by James Cox and based on the real-life Wonderland Murders that occurred in 1981. The film stars Val Kilmer, Kate Bosworth, Dylan McDermott, Carrie Fisher, Lisa Kudrow, Josh Lucas, Christina Applegate, Tim Blake Nelson, and Janeane Garofalo. Kilmer plays the role of John Holmes, a famous  pornographic film star and suspected accomplice in four grisly murders committed in a house at 8763 Wonderland Avenue, in the Laurel Canyon section of Los Angeles.

Plot

John Holmes and Dawn Schiller
The girlfriend of John Holmes, Dawn Schiller, is on the streets and picked up by a holy roller after Holmes leaves Schiller in a hotel room. Schiller eventually calls Holmes to come and get her. Holmes arrives at the apartment, and they have sex and snort cocaine in the bathroom. The next morning, while in a motel room, Dawn sees a newscast that states four people were murdered at a rowhouse on Wonderland Avenue, the same one she had earlier been at with Holmes. The story eventually moves on to two city detectives investigating the crime, Sam Nico and Louis Cruz, and their contact with Holmes. Another officer, Billy Ward, intervenes in the investigation.

David Lind's story
The next major character introduced is David Lind. He hears of his friends' murders at Wonderland and soon discovers his girlfriend was there. While at the crime scene, he is picked up by Nico and Cruz. Through Lind's story (told in flashbacks), we are introduced to some of the people who partied at Wonderland. These people, known as the Wonderland Gang, included Ron Launius and his wife Susan, Billy Deverell, Lind's 22-year-old girlfriend Barbara Richardson, and Joy Miller. Ron has a fondness for antique guns and frequently shows them off. When he learns that Holmes knows notorious gangster Eddie Nash, he gives Holmes a pair of stolen antique guns to take to Nash, so that Nash can fence them and the Wonderland Gang can split the loot. (Nash had befriended Holmes because of Holmes' notoriety as the porn film phenomenon Johnny Wadd.) Holmes takes the guns to Nash, but Nash says the guns are too rare to be sold, as they would be recognized right away and everyone involved would be apprehended. Rather than return the guns to Holmes, Nash keeps them for himself. Attempting to get back in the gang's good graces, Holmes suggests robbing Nash's home. Ron Launius is reluctant to go along with the robbery at first, but after Holmes gives him a rundown of what's there, he is eager to participate. Holmes volunteers to draw them a map to plan the robbery, since he has visited Nash's house frequently. Holmes then visits Nash to buy drugs, and on the way out leaves the kitchen door unlocked to give the Wonderland gang easy access.

The robbery of Eddie Nash
The next morning, Ron Launius, Lind, and Deverell carry out the robbery, while wheel-man Tracy McCourt waits outside in a car, serving as lookout. Neither Holmes nor any of the women are present when the robbery occurs. The Wonderland Gang gains access through the unlocked kitchen door and robs Nash at gunpoint. Lind accidentally fires his gun, wounding Nash's bodyguard, Greg Diles. The gang hurls racial epithets at Nash and Diles and walks away with over one million dollars in cash, jewels, and drugs. They bring their loot back to the Wonderland apartment to divide everything up. Holmes is unhappy with the cut he is given, even though he did not take part in the robbery and he's in debt to the gang.

Nash discovers Holmes was involved in the robbery, he has Holmes beaten and finds Holmes' little black book. He tells Holmes he will kill every person listed in the book, starting with Holmes' mother, if Holmes does not give up the men who robbed him.

July 1, 1981
The retaliation for the robbery is swift and fatal. On July 1, 1981, a group of Nash's henchmen (including Holmes), led by Diles, gains access to the apartment at Wonderland Avenue. Ron Launius, Deverell, Richardson, and Miller are all brutally beaten to death with striated lead pipes. Diles compels Holmes to deliver blows to Launius. Susan Launius is beaten but survives, and is questioned by Nico and Cruz in her hospital bed. She tells them (in a near comatose state) that she does not remember anything, only shadows. Lind is not present during the attacks.

Cast

 Val Kilmer as John Holmes
 Kate Bosworth as Dawn Schiller
 Dylan McDermott as David Lind
 Carrie Fisher as Sally Hansen
 Josh Lucas as Ron Launius
 Christina Applegate as Susan Launius
 Ted Levine as Detective Sam Nico
 Tim Blake Nelson as Billy Deverell
 Janeane Garofalo as Joy Miller
 Natasha Gregson Wagner as Barbara Richardson
 Faizon Love as Greg Diles
 Joleigh Pulsonetti as Alexa
 Lisa Kudrow as Sharon Holmes
 M. C. Gainey as Detective Billy Ward
 Joel Michaely as Bruce
 Franky G as Detective Louis Cruz
 Eric Bogosian as Eddie Nash
 Paris Hilton as Barbie
 Scoot McNairy as Jack
 John Holmes (archival footage) as Johnny Wadd
 Michael Pitt (deleted scenes) as 'Gopher'
 Alexis Dziena (deleted scenes) as Gopher's girlfriend

Reception
On Rotten Tomatoes the film has an approval rating of 34% based on 101 reviews. The site's consensus states: "A sordid and pointless movie with some good performances." On Metacritic it has a score of 43% based on reviews from  36  critics, indicating "mixed or average reviews".

Roger Ebert gave the film a mediocre review, granting it two out of four stars, and saying: "True crime procedurals can have a certain fascination, but not when they're jumbled glimpses of what might or might not have happened involving a lot of empty people whose main claim to fame is that they're dead."

References

External links
 
 

2003 films
2003 crime drama films
American crime drama films
American independent films
American nonlinear narrative films
Canadian crime drama films
Canadian independent films
Crime films based on actual events
Films about drugs
Films about pornography
Films about violence
Films directed by James Cox
Films set in 1981
Films set in Los Angeles
Films scored by Cliff Martinez
MoviePass Films films
English-language Canadian films
Laurel Canyon, Los Angeles
Lionsgate films
Killer Films films
2000s English-language films
2000s American films
2000s Canadian films